Henri Ferrari (23 September 1912 – 15 February 1975) was a French male former weightlifter, who competed in the light heavyweight class and represented France at international competitions. He won the bronze medal at the 1946 World Weightlifting Championships in the 82.5 kg category. In Argenteuil in the 1960s, Henri Ferrari coached a number of future champions to include Marc Vouillot among others.

References

1912 births
1975 deaths
French male weightlifters
World Weightlifting Championships medalists
20th-century French people